The Knights Templar Cartel (Spanish: Los Caballeros Templarios) was a Mexican criminal organization originally composed of the remnants of La Familia Michoacana drug cartel based in the Mexican State of Michoacán.

The Knights Templar Cartel indoctrinates its operatives to "fight and die" for the cartel. They have taken full control of the now defunct La Familia Michoacana operations in states including Michoacán, Guerrero, the state of Mexico, and Morelos.

History 
After the first alleged death of Francisco Montes and co-founder Nazario Moreno, leaders of the La Familia Michoacana cartel, on 9 December 2010, a split between the cartel leaders emerged. Some of the cartel co-founders, Montes brothers; Fred Montes CM and Frank Montes, Servando Gómez Martínez, and Dionisio Loya Plancarte, formed into a Royalty of La Familia calling itself Caballeros Templarios (or Knights Templar). A large part of La Familia Michoacana left with them to form the Knights Templar group, while José de Jesús Méndez Vargas kept the leadership of the now greatly diminished "Familia Michoacana", starting a fight for the control of Michoacán.

Along with the Sinaloa Cartel and the Gulf Cartel, the Knights Templar formed a short-lived joint enforcer gang called Cárteles Unidos (English: United Cartels) or La Resistencia, composed of well-trained gunmen dedicated to kill and expel Los Zetas Cartel operatives who were invading the former La Familia Michoacana territories in Michoacán and Jalisco.

The Templars' most recent feud is against the Jalisco New Generation Cartel, which is trying to gain full control of Jalisco and Michoacán, and also against Civilian vigilante and Militia groups that are fighting back the criminals in an attempt to clear Michoacan from the Knights Templar.

On 27 February 2015, Servando "La Tuta" Gómez Leader of the Knights Templar was arrested by the Mexican federal police.  A number of his associates were also arrested and many properties were also seized by the Mexican government.

End of cartel 
As of September 2017, it is believed the cartel has ceased to exist after their leader Pablo "El 500" Toscano Padilla and his lieutenant Ezequiel "El Cheques" Castaneda were reported to have been killed by remnants of La Nueva Familia Michoacana Organization while on their way to a regional meeting with members of the Jalisco New Generation Cartel to form an alliance with them. By May 2020, all 39 non-New Generation cartel operating in Guerrero were splinter cartels. In June 2020, it was reported that the Cartel del Abuelo and Los Viagras, as well as to a lesser extent the Jalisco New Generation Cartel, were the active cartels in Michoacán.

Narco-banners

The former Pope Benedict XVI had a visit scheduled on 23 March 2012 to the Mexican state of Guanajuato. Prior to that date, on 17 March 2012, the Knights Templar Cartel allegedly put up 14 banners on the bridges of León, San Miguel de Allende, Irapuato, Salamanca, Yuriria, Moroleón and Uriangato, all municipalities of Guanajuato, pledging to not provoke any violent acts during the pope's visit. The banners read the following, "The Knights Templar Cartel will not partake in any warlike acts, we are not killers, welcome Pope (sic)".

There were other similar banners that were allegedly signed by their rivals, the Jalisco New Generation Cartel.

Ethical code 
The Knights Templar cartel was founded on a strict ethical code developed by La Tuta. The code is contained in a small book that is handed out to all members of the cartel and even to the public. The book is decorated with knights on horseback with lances and crosses. The 22 page book is titled "The Code of the Knights Templar of Michoacan" and contains the rules and regulations of the gang. The gang has based its rules on those of the European Knights Templar. Members swear to help the poor and helpless, fight against materialism, respect women and children, not kill for money, and not use drugs.  The Knights even go as far as drug testing all members. While the cartel has moved more towards accepting criminal acts prohibited by the ethical code, breaking the code can still incur punishment by death.

See also

 Mexican Drug War
José Manuel Mireles Valverde, leader of a group of paramilitary self-defense groups that work against the Knights Templar Cartel

References

Organizations established in 2011
2011 establishments in Mexico
Organizations disestablished in 2017
2017 disestablishments in Mexico
Disbanded Mexican drug cartels
Mexican drug war
History of Michoacán